The Eastern Washington Eagles men's basketball team represents Eastern Washington University in Cheney, Washington, United States. The school's team currently competes in the Big Sky Conference, of which it has been a member since 1987.

Key statistics

Head Coaches

Postseason

NCAA tournament results
The Eagles have appeared in three NCAA tournaments, with a combined record of 0–3.

National Invitation Tournament results
The Eagles have appeared in two National Invitation Tournaments, with a combined record of 1-2.

College Basketball Invitational results
The Eagles have appeared in the College Basketball Invitational three times, with a combined record of 1–3.

The Basketball Classic results
The Eagles have appeared in The Basketball Classic one time. Their record is 0–1.

NAIA tournament results
The Eagles appeared in the NAIA Tournament five times, with a combined record of 6–5.

All-time NBA Draft selections

Awards
Associated Press All-Americans
 Alvin Snow* – 2004
 Rodney Stuckey* – 2006, 2007
 Tyler Harvey* – 2015
 Jacob Wiley* – 2017
 Bogdan Bliznyuk* – 2018

(*) Denotes Honorable Mention

Big Sky Most Valuable Player
 Alvin Snow – 2004
 Rodney Stuckey – 2006
 Jacob Wiley – 2017
 Bogdan Bliznyuk – 2018
 Mason Peatling – 2020
 Tanner Groves – 2021
 Steele Venters – 2023

Big Sky Coach of the Year
 Steve Aggers – 1998, 2000
 Ray Giacoletti – 2004
 Jim Hayford – 2015
 Shantay Legans – 2020
 David Riley – 2023

Big Sky Defensive Player of the Year
 Alvin Snow – 2002
 Kim Aiken, Jr. – 2021

Big Sky Top Reserve of the Year
 Tyler Robertson – 2021

Big Sky Freshman of the Year
 Marc Axton – 2002
 Matt Nelson – 2004
 Rodney Stuckey – 2006
 Glen Dean – 2010
 Venky Jois – 2013
 Bogdan Bliznyuk – 2015

Awards information comes from the 2016–2017 media guide.

Retired jerseys

References

External links